Hunkovce is a village and municipality in Svidník District in the Prešov Region of north-eastern Slovakia.

History
In historical records the village was first mentioned in 1548.

During World War II the huge Battle of the Dukla Pass took place in the area around Hunkovce.  Today the town has a German World War II cemetery which contains the graves of approx. 3,000 German soldiers that participated in the Battle of the Dukla Pass.

Geography
The municipality lies at an altitude of 310 metres and covers an area of 6.960 km2. It has a population of about 341 people.

Genealogical resources

The records for genealogical research are available at the state archive "Statny Archiv in Presov, Slovakia"

 Greek Catholic church records (births/marriages/deaths): 1823-1922 (parish B)

See also
 List of municipalities and towns in Slovakia

References

External links 
 
 https://web.archive.org/web/20070513023228/http://www.statistics.sk/mosmis/eng/run.html
Surnames of living people in Hunkovce

Villages and municipalities in Svidník District
Šariš